The Schaumburg Township District Library (STDL), located in Schaumburg, Illinois, is the second largest public library in Illinois. It serves the Schaumburg Township area, covering sections of Schaumburg, Hoffman Estates, Hanover Park, Roselle, and Elk Grove Village. Both Hoffman Estates and Hanover Park have branch libraries located in the villages. Annual circulation of materials totals approximately two million items, while nearly one million people visit the library each year.

The  central library provides patrons the use of more than 180 computers and access to more than 600,000 items, including books, DVDs, CDs, computer software, and more. Special features include a glass sculpture by internationally renowned artist Dale Chihuly, as well as many other works by famous artists, a fireplace, an original illustration gallery, and a café. The Youth Services Department has a unique Enchanted Forest area displaying well known children's book characters and offering a kid-friendly atmosphere for reading or game playing.

History

The library dates back to 1962, when local voters approved a tax funding mechanism for the Schaumburg Township Public Library. In 1963, a collection was established in a small home near the intersection of Roselle and Schaumburg Roads. A dedicated facility was constructed and opened in 1965. In 1968, a lower level and Children's Department were added to the library.

In 1970, a referendum for a larger library passed, but did not result in the construction of a new building; instead, an addition to the library was completed by 1987. The library also opened branches in Hoffman Estates (in 1992) and Hanover Park (in 1993). Another referendum for a larger central library passed in 1995, and construction on the current building in Schaumburg Town Square began in 1997. The central library moved into the building in 1998.

In 2012, the library opened its Teen Place. On December 28, 2016, the library opened The Commons, an area including the lobby and audiovisual departments. In 2020, the library underwent further renovations.

Local History Digital Archive
In 2001, the library initiated a Local History Digital Archive.  The archive is a collection of digitized photographs, videos, and documents relating to Schaumburg Township history.  To date, over 60,000 items have been posted on the archive and are viewable through either a keyword search or browsing by subject.  Each item also has its own record which, in many cases, includes any history or commentary on the item being viewed.  Items date back to the 1840s, when Schaumburg Township was first surveyed. 

In addition to the digital archive, the library also maintains a blog on the History of Schaumburg Township (HOST).

Departments
Being the second largest public library in Illinois, the main branch is broken up into the following departments:
Audiovisual
Circulation
Computer Assistance
New Books and Fiction
Non-Fiction and Reference
Teen Place
Youth Services

There are more departments within STDL, including Extension Services, Graphics, Public Relations, and IT. The above list includes only the departments available to the public, which are disclosed to help visitors navigate the library more easily.

Awards

 1999: Commercial Building Award of Excellence Merit Award
 2005: 101 Best & Brightest Companies to Work For
 2010: Al Larson Environmental Award

See also
 Schaumburg, Illinois

References

External links

 Library Homepage
 Local History Digital Archive

Schaumburg, Illinois
Public libraries in Illinois
Libraries in Cook County, Illinois
Library buildings completed in 1965
Library buildings completed in 1998